is the seventh single by Japanese singer Yōko Oginome, released on November 21, 1985 by Victor Entertainment. It is a Japanese-language cover of the 1985 song "Eat You Up" by British singer-songwriter Angie Gold.

Background and release
"Dancing Hero (Eat You Up)" is a cover of the 1985 song "Eat You Up" by British singer-songwriter Angie Gold with Japanese lyrics by Hitoshi Shinohara. The song was originally planned to be titled , but "Dancing Hero" was chosen as the final title by Rising Production's president Tetsuo Taira.

"Dancing Hero (Eat You Up)" was first released in Japan on November 21, 1985 and peaked at No. 5 on Oricon's singles chart, making it Oginome's first top-five single. It also sold over 324,000 copies. The song earned Oginome the Nippon Television Idol Award at the 12th Nippon Television Music Festival, the Best Idol Award at the 12th All Japan Kayo Music Festival, and the Wired Music Award at the 19th Japan Cable Awards. The achievements allowed Oginome to perform on the 37th Kōhaku Uta Gassen in 1986.

The original music video features Oginome wearing a pink wig and dressed in a costume made of origami.

Oginome also recorded an English version of "Dancing Hero (Eat You Up)", with new lyrics by Marco Bruno. This version was first included in her 1986 album Raspberry Wind.

In the segment, Oginome and the Tunnels (Takaaki Ishibashi and Noritake Kinashi) would dance when the song played; the song would end abruptly with Kinashi singing off-key before being attacked by Ishibashi (and sometimes Oginome). The song was replaced by Oginome's other single "Coffee Rumba" in 1993.

The song resurfaced to public attention in 2017, when the dance club from Tomioka High School in Sakai, Osaka used the song for their routine reworked with Dead or Alive's 1985 song "You Spin Me Round (Like a Record)" and catch phrases from comedian Nora Hirano. During the dance, the students wore costumes paying homage to 1980s fashion. Their routine first gained media interest when they won second place at Dance Stadium, a national high school dance competition, in August, with the choreography named the "bubbly dance" after the economic bubble in Japan during the 1980s. When a video featuring the "bubbly dance" was uploaded onto YouTube, it gained 2.5 million likes within the first two days. The dance routine renewed interest in "Dancing Hero (Eat You Up)", and Oginome praised Tomioka Dance Club. Oginome and the Tomioka Dance Club received the Special Award at the 59th Japan Record Awards that year.

On November 8, 2017, Oginome released the digital single "Dancing Hero: All Eat You Up", which contains all versions of the song she had recorded over the past 30 years. It peaked at No. 2 on the Billboard Japan Hot 100. In addition, the digital single was certified Gold by the RIAJ.

Track listing

1985 single

2013 bonus tracks

Dancing Hero: All Eat You Up
All lyrics are written by Hitoshi Shinohara, except where indicated; all music is composed by Angelina Kyte and Anthony Baker.

Charts

1985 single
Weekly charts

Year-end charts

Dancing Hero: All Eat You Up
Weekly charts

Year-end charts

Certification

Dancing Hero: The Archives

On December 20, 2017, Oginome released a special CD titled , which is an expanded version of "Dancing Hero: All Eat You Up" with a live version and additional instrumental versions. The Instrumental (Up-Tempo) version of the song is the same one used by the Tomioka Dance Club on their live performances.

The single peaked at No. 15 on Oricon's singles chart in 2018.

Track listing
All lyrics are written by Hitoshi Shinohara, except where indicated; all music is composed by Angelina Kyte and Anthony Baker.

Charts

Cover versions
 Priscilla Chan covered the song in Cantonese as "Tiu Mou Gaai" (lit. "Dancing Street") in 1986. The song topped the Hong Kong charts and was awarded the 1986 Jade Solid Gold Best Ten Award for Most Popular Disco Song.
 Taiwanese singer Qian Youlan covered the song in Mandarin as "Bōlí wǔ xié" (lit. "Glass Dancing Shoes") in 1987.
 In the 1990s, Sandeep Sapkota released a Nepalese version called "Dance Tonight" in his album Ayaam.
 Demon Kakka covered the song on his 2007 cover album Girls Rock Hakurai. His cover incorporates the lyrics of Angie Gold's version.
 MAX covered the song on their 2010 cover album Be MAX.
 Runa Rukawa covered the song in 2015 as her second single.
 Akina Nakamori covered the song on her 2017 cover album Cage.
 In 2018, Celeb Five, a South Korean parody group consisting of comedians Song Eun-i, Shin Bong-sun, Ahn Young-mi, Kim Young-hee, and Kim Shin-young, released a mondegreen parody of the song titled "Celeb Five (I Wanna Be a Celeb)", borrowing the bubbly dance choreography and concept from Tomioka Dance Club. The music video was directed by Shindong from Super Junior.
 Bentley Jones covered the song on his 2019 cover album Translated.

References

External links
 (Single)
 (Dancing Hero: All Eat You Up)
 (Dancing Hero: The Archives)

1985 singles
Yōko Oginome songs
Japanese-language songs
Electronic dance music songs
Internet memes introduced in 2017
Victor Entertainment singles